The following is a list of notable alumni from King's College, Hong Kong.

1930s

Chung Sze-yuen (鍾士元)  , Hong Kong mechanical engineer, industrialist, business executive and politician
D. C. Lau (劉殿爵), prominent sinologist; author of the widely read translations of Tao Te Ching, Mencius and The Analects; contributed to the Proper Cantonese pronunciation movement
George Ho (何佐芝) GBS, OBE, JP, Hong Kong media mogul; fifth son of influential Hong Kong businessman Robert Hotung
Harry Fang (方心讓) GBM, CBE, JP, Hong Kong orthopaedic surgeon; legislator and campaigner who promoted rehabilitation services; widely known as the "father of rehabilitation" in Asia
James Wu Man-hon (胡文瀚), former chairman of the Federation of Hong Kong Industries
Ma Lin (馬臨), Vice-Chancellor of the Chinese University of Hong Kong (CUHK) from 1978 to 1987; founder of Shaw College, the fourth constituent college of CUHK
Simon Li (李福善) GBM, Hong Kong senior judge and politician
Stanley Kwan Shih-kuang (關士光) MBE, Hong Kong banker who created the internationally known Hang Seng Index in 1969

1940s

Chiu Hin-kwong (招顯洸), OBE, JP, former member of the Executive Council and Legislative Council of Hong Kong

1950s

Harnam Singh Grewal (高禮和) CBE ED, career civil servant of Hong Kong; former Secretary for the Civil Service in the Government of Hong Kong
Hui Ki On (許淇安) GBS, CBE, QPM, the last Commissioner of the Royal Hong Kong Police from 1994 to 1997; the first Commissioner of Hong Kong Police from 1 July 1997 to 1 January 2001
Hui Yin-fat (許賢發) OBE, JP, member of the Legislative Council of Hong Kong (1991—1995) for Social Services; member of the Executive Council in 1991; member of the Provisional Legislative Council; director of Hong Kong Council of Social Service from 1973 to 2001
Li Kwan Ha (李君夏), the first ethnic Chinese to serve as the Commissioner of the Royal Hong Kong Police in Hong Kong

1960s

Cheung Kwok Che (張國柱), member of the Legislative Council of Hong Kong (Functional constituency, Social Welfare)
Ching W. Tang (鄧青雲), American physical chemist; awarded the Wolf Prize in Chemistry
David Chan Yuk-cheung (陳毓祥), prominent leader of the Baodiao movement in Hong Kong
Deborah Chung (鍾端玲), American scientist and author
Hui Chiu-yin (許招賢) BBS, director and general manager of New World First Ferry in Hong Kong; former Chief Superintendent of Marine Regional in Hong Kong Police Force
Inez Fung (馮又嫦), professor of atmospheric science at the University of California, Berkeley
Lam Chiu Ying (林超英)SBS, Hong Kong meteorologist; bird-watcher; conservationist and blogger; director of the Hong Kong observatory from 2003 through 2009; honorary fellow of the Royal Meteorological Society; Honorary University Fellow of the University of Hong Kong; honorary president of the Hong Kong Bird Watching Society
Law Chi-kwong (羅致光) JP, Hong Kong politician; associate professor in social work at the University of Hong Kong
Leung Chun Ying (梁振英) GBM, GBS, JP, third and incumbent Chief Executive of the Executive Council of the Hong Kong Special Administrative Region
Patrick Lau Lai-chiu (劉勵超) JP, SBS, former career civil servant in the Hong Kong Government; retired in 2007 as Director of Lands, head of the Lands Department
Raymond Or (柯清輝) SBS, JP, Vice-Chairman of G-Resources Group; Vice-Chairman and Chief Executive Officer of China Strategic Group; chairman of Esprit Holdings

1970s

Ceajer Chan Ka-keung (陳家強) SBS, JP, Secretary for Financial Services and the Treasury in the Government of Hong Kong
Johnson Lam Man-hon (林文瀚), Vice President of the Court of Appeal of the High Court (Hong Kong)

1980s

Wilson Shieh (石家豪), Hong Kong artist

References

Alumni of King's College, Hong Kong